The Cerros de Sal Formation is a geologic formation in the southern Dominican Republic. The coastal claystone preserves coral fossils dating back to the Late Miocene period.

See also 
 List of fossiliferous stratigraphic units in the Dominican Republic

References

Further reading 
 T. W. Vaughan, W. Cooke, D. D. Condit, C. P. Ross, W. P. Woodring and F. C. Calkins. 1921. A geological reconnaissance of the Dominican Republic. Geological Survey of the Dominican Republic Memoir 1:1-268

Geologic formations of the Dominican Republic
Neogene Dominican Republic
Shale formations